Győző Soós (11 November 1948 –  26 August 2015) was a Hungarian politician, Member of Parliament between 1994 and 2006 (MSZP). He represented Sátoraljaújhely from 1994 to 1998, after that he was elected MP from the Socialist Party's Borsod-Abaúj-Zemplén County Regional List.

Soós died on 26 August 2015 at the age of 66, following a long illness.

References

1948 births
2015 deaths
Members of the Hungarian Socialist Workers' Party
Hungarian Socialist Party politicians
Members of the National Assembly of Hungary (1994–1998)
Members of the National Assembly of Hungary (1998–2002)
Members of the National Assembly of Hungary (2002–2006)
People from Miskolc